The 7th Annual Webby Awards were held in San Francisco, California on June 5, 2003. Due to budget cutbacks made in response to the 2002 Internet bubble, the decision was made to hold this year's ceremony partially online. This would be the last year that the Webbys would be presented in California prior to their relocation in New York City. For this award ceremony, the business category was expanded with the addition of a new award for "Best Online Businesses." This award would be presented for "sites that excel at achieving fundamental business goals such as increasing sales lead generation or enhancing customer loyalty and retention, marketplace impact and innovation."

Nominees and winners

(from http://www.webbyawards.com/winners/2003)

References
Winners and nominees are generally named according to the organization or website winning the award, although the recipient is, technically, the web design firm or internal department that created the winning site and in the case of corporate websites, the designer's client.  Web links are provided for informational purposes, both in the most recently available archive.org version before the awards ceremony and, where available, the current website.  Many older websites no longer exist, are redirected, or have been substantially redesigned.

External links
Official website

2003
2003 awards in the United States
2003 in San Francisco
June 2003 events in the United States
2003 in Internet culture